The Last Gold is a 2016 film about American swimmers Shirley Babashoff, Kim Peyton, Jill Sterkel, and Wendy Boglioli and winning a gold medal in a relay at the 1976 Olympic Games, defeating the East Germans.

Cast
Shirley Babashoff
Kim Peyton
Jill Sterkel
Wendy Boglioli
Juliana Margulies
John Naber

References

External links

Documentary films about women's sports
Swimming at the 1976 Summer Olympics
Documentary films about the Olympics
2016 films
2016 documentary films
American sports documentary films
Swimming films
Films about the 1976 Summer Olympics
2010s American films